The Congregational Federation is a small Christian denomination in Great Britain comprising 235 congregations, down from 294 in April 2014. The Federation brings together Congregational churches, and provides support and guidance to member churches both financially and otherwise.

History
The Federation was formed in 1972 from those Congregational churches which did not enter the union of the Presbyterian Church of England with the Congregational Church in England and Wales to form the United Reformed Church. The leaders at the time were Reginald Cleaves, Margaret, Viscountess Stansgate, John Wilcox and Elsie Chamberlain. Margaret, Viscountess Stansgate became the Federation's first President.

The Federation was expanded in 2000 by member churches of the Congregational Union of Scotland that chose not to join their merger with the United Reformed Church. 

It is a member of the International Congregational Fellowship, an international network of Congregational churches and their national associations. Some of its churches are also in membership of the Evangelical Fellowship of Congregational Churches.

The offices of the Congregational Federation are in Nottingham, England.

Ecumenical relations
The Congregational Federation is a member of: 
Action of Churches Together in Scotland
Churches Together in Britain and Ireland
Churches Together in England
Cytûn

Churches 

The churches are organised into 10 geographical regions. CC stands for Congregational Church/Chapel.

Eastern

References

External links

Official website of the Congregational History Society

Congregationalism in the United Kingdom
Congregational denominations established in the 20th century
Organisations based in Nottingham
Reformed denominations in the United Kingdom
Christian organizations established in 1972